Mónica Patricia Fonseca Delgadillo (born June 10, 1982) is a Colombian-American television presenter, journalist and blogger who was born in Miami, Florida. UN Environmental Ambassador, AUDI ambassador, spokesperson and media outlet, ING Financial Partners affiliate for their "Helping Build Wealth" program.

She works as a talent for CNET Networks, she also has her own feature segment on the Univision show "¡Despierta América!" called "Las Mujeres También Hablamos de Tecnología" (Women Also Talk About Technology), where she talks and presents the latest gadgets and apps for the daily life. 
    
She's also co-host in the original production of V-me, Show Business Extra which is broadcast in the United States for the Hispanic audience.

Talent for LatinWE, co-foundress of the online beauty platform Fancybox, and also foundress and spokesperson for Instafit.

Nowadays she is a Huggies Mom, spokesperson for Rowenta Beauty Tools, "it girl" for Arkitect by Pink Filosofy, spokesperson and image for the breast cancer awareness campaign #ÚneteALaLucha by Chocolyne along with the photographer Andrés Oyuela and designer Mónica Holguín.

Early life and Career
Mónica Fonseca begun her career when she was just a kid along with her father Carlos Fonseca Zárate, her father is an Environmentalist/Civil Engineer and Economist, he was the Deputy Minister of Environment for Colombia. Always inspired in her father's example, she worked as his assistant in several environmental projects, congresses and conferences since she was little. Fonseca began her Political Science studies at Universidad De Los Andes and then she traveled to Maryland, United States where she continued her studies and worked in an NGO's called Environmental Solutions where she was in charge of the online project to make the encyclopedia of Marine Areas of the Caribbean Spanish digital edition.

Along with her friends she produced fashion shows at age 15 and that is how she began modeling. Her first television appearance was for CityTV as an guest host of RadioCity where she covered fashion events for the network. In 2001 she worked as a presenter for CityTV in the program Citynoticias (she presented the entertainment section), RadioCity and the CityCápsula.

Trajectory 

In 2004, she started working at Caracol Radio and participated in various broadcasts for the network, among them Los 40 Principales, in which she was part of the morning programme A Despertar, she received the Shock award for best commercial radio voice that same year by public polling.

Later on, she was part of the working table for the show La Ventana for Caracol Radio. In 2005, Fonseca leaves City TV to present the show called Hola Escola broadcast in Canal Uno along with the Argentinian presenter, director and musician Cesar Escola. The show was worth of an statuette by the India Catalina awards.

In the second trimester of 2005, Fonseca ingressed to Canal Caracol, presenting the humor show "También Caerás" (You will fell for it, too) along with the singer, presenter and actor Moisés Angulo. In October of that year, Fonseca replaced the presenter and singer Adriana Tono in the entertainment section of the news broadcast Caracol Noticias

She made special coverage of reigns and fairs in Colombia, she was nominated by TV y Novelas magazine as best entertainment presenter because of her work in Caracol Noticias

Fonseca presented at the Discovery Travel & Living a show in which she traveled to different places in Latin America and introduced the diverse lifestyles, travels, boutique hotels, spas and luxury hotels.

In 2006, Fonseca leaves "La Ventana" to be part of the working table of the show with the highest number of listeners at night "La Hora Del Regreso" de W Radio, directed by Julio Sánchez Cristo.

In February 2007, the news director Alvaro Garcia, hires her to present the morning edition of Noticias RCN, where simultaneously Fonseca proposes to create a dedicated space for technology, that is how the section called Mundo Digital was created, she directed and presented this section for six years.

In this year, she was the TV host for the program 13 Pasos for Cosmopolitan channel, where she began a relationship with the Mexican actor Mark Tacher, they were married 2010 and ended the relationship in 2011.

In 2008, Claudia Gurisatti invited Fonseca to take part of the talent for NTN24 and to have a 30 minutes section where Fonseca created and directed Ciencia, Salud y Tecnología (Science, Health and Technology) until 2013, this section was avowed and awarded by the experts in the fields and she co-hosted Planeta Gente, obtaining an India Catalina award.

In 2011 she was in a show called Los Originales of the broadcasting station called La X by the network Radial Todelar along with Jaime Sáncez Cristo and his crew

That same year, she was special guest at the jury for Project Runway Latin America for the Glitz* channel.

In August 2011 she married actor and producer Juan Pablo Raba in a private ceremony in Miami, United States, they have a son Joaquín Raba Fonseca, he was born July 19, 2012.

She is a presenter and host for special events, Fonseca has been spokesperson for several brands like Huggies, Mother Care, Pepa Pombo, Amelia Toro, Pink Filosofy, Apple, Almacenes Éxito, UNE, Pantene, Loreal, Despegar.com, BlackBerry,  Seven-Seven Belier, Rowenta, Listerine, Ministerio de Trabajo and Adriana Arango.

Awards and recognition

 Infashion Magazine Awards
 Cartagena International Music Festival
 TvyNovelas awards (different nominations and categories)
 Mapa del Poder Revista Semana, Most Influential People In Digital Media of Colombia

References

External links 
 Stock Models
 Perfil oficial en Twitter de Monica Fonseca
 Mundo Digital Rcn con Mónica Fonseca
Página oficial de Facebook 
Juan Pablo Raba Y Mònica Fonseca en portada ALÓ
Mònica Fonseca en portada ALÒ embarazada
Portada TV Y Novelas
Vme TV - Televisión Diferente

1982 births
Living people
American people of Colombian descent
Colombian journalists